Aylesworth is an unincorporated community in Marshall County, Oklahoma, United States. A post office operated in Aylesworth from June 6, 1903 to October 15, 1943. The community was named after a Dawes Commission official named Allison Aylesworth. Most of the original Aylesworth community is now underneath Lake Texoma.

References

Unincorporated communities in Marshall County, Oklahoma
Unincorporated communities in Oklahoma
Populated places established in 1903
Populated places disestablished in 1943
1903 establishments in Indian Territory